Juan Manuel Pascal Cachaizamba (born 14 August 1973) is an Angolan footballer. He played in ten matches for the Angola national football team from 1997 to 1999. He was also named in Angola's squad for the 1998 African Cup of Nations tournament.

References

External links
 
 

1973 births
Living people
Angolan footballers
Angola international footballers
1998 African Cup of Nations players
Place of birth missing (living people)
Association football midfielders
Atlético Petróleos de Luanda players